The Ethiopian Ministry of Youth & Sport is the department of the Government of Ethiopia responsible for promoting community-based sport to build the nation's image and facilitate youth development. The Ministry works closely with national and international stakeholders.

According to the reorganization of the Federal Democratic Republic of Ethiopian proclamation NO 471/2005, the ministry is responsible for facilitating the formation of youth organizations to support national development, monitor and support youth initiatives, enable public participation in sport, develop sports and training facilities, oversee sports medicine and combat doping, and coordinate sports associations at a national level.

Ministers
The Ministry is run by a Minister and two state Ministers.

References

External links
 Ethiopian Ministry of Youth & Sports official website

Youth and Sport
Ethiopia